Zur Freiheit is a German television series.

See also
List of German television series

External links
 

1987 German television series debuts
1988 German television series endings
Television shows set in Munich
German-language television shows
Das Erste original programming
Bayerischer Rundfunk
Grimme-Preis for fiction winners